Cybersex is the second commercial mixtape by American singer Blackbear, released on November 27, 2017, by Beartrap, Alamo Records, and Interscope Records. It was preceded by two official singles; "Playboy Shit" featuring Lil Aaron and "Up In This" with Tinashe.

Background
Blackbear released his fifth extended play (EP), Salt on April 2, 2017. He released his third solo studio album Digital Druglord on April 20 to critical acclaim, charting at No. 19 on the Canadian Albums Chart and at No. 14 on the U.S. Billboard 200. While touring as a supporting act on American rock band Fall Out Boy's The Mania Tour in North America, Blackbear began writing and recording his next musical project.

Promotion
Blackbear first revealed Cybersex on his SoundCloud bio during July which many people did not see until his official reveal on August 13, 2017.

Singles
The first single, "Playboy Shit", featuring American rapper Lil Aaron, was released on October 6, 2017 exclusively on PornHub. "Playboy Shit" was later released for digital download and streaming on October 13. "Up In This", with American singer Tinashe was released as the second single on October 26.

Promotional singles
The first promotional single, "Bright Pink Tims", featuring American rapper Cam'ron, was released on October 20. On November 13, he released the second promotional single, "Gucci Linen", featuring American rapper 2 Chainz.

Track listing
Credits were adapted from iTunes and Tidal.

Notes
  signifies a co-producer
 Every song is stylized in lowercase letters. For example, "Playboy Shit" is stylized as "playboy shit".

Personnel
Credits were adapted from Tidal.

Performers
 Blackbear – primary artist
 Tinashe – primary artist 
 Ne-Yo – primary artist 
 2 Chainz – featured artist 
 Cam'ron – featured artist 
 Lil Aaron – featured artist 
 Machine Gun Kelly – featured artist 
 FRND – featured artist 
 T-Pain – featured artist 
 Rick Ross – featured artist 
 THEY. – featured artist 
 Paul Wall – featured artist 
 Riff Raff – featured artist 

Technical
 Blackbear – engineer 
 Maddox Chhim – mixing engineer 

Production
 Jesse "Corparal" Wilson – producer 
 Rad Cat – co-producer , producer 
 Aaron Zuckerman – producer 
 Tarro – producer 
 Judge – producer 
 Wax Motif – co-producer 
 FRND – producer 
 Good Intent – producer 
 Hot Sugar – producer 
 Ayo – producer 
 Keyz – producer 
 Blackbear – producer 
 J. Hill – producer

Charts

References

2017 albums
Blackbear (musician) albums
Interscope Records albums